The 2011–12 FA Vase Final was the 38th final of The Football Association's cup competition for teams at levels 9–11 of the English football league system. The match was contested between Dunston UTS, of the Northern League Division 1 (level 9), and West Auckland Town, of the Northern League Division 1 (level 9).

Match

Details

References

External links
 YouTube highlights

FA Vase Finals
FA Vase Final
FA Vase Final
FA Vase Final
Events at Wembley Stadium